Robert Lebel may refer to:
 Robert Lebel (bishop) (1924–2015), Canadian Roman Catholic prelate, bishop
 Robert Lebel (ice hockey) (1905–1999), Canadian ice hockey administrator
 Robert Lebel (art critic) (1901–1986), French art critic and writer, father of Jean-Jacques Lebel